The Panay River (known as Pan-ay River) is the longest river on Panay Island in the Philippines, with a total length of approximately  and a drainage basin area of . It drains almost the entire province of Capiz and northern portion of Iloilo province.

The source of the Panay River is on the slopes of Mount Igabon–Mount Angas Mountain Range. Starting in Tapaz, it runs southward and changing its direction toward east-northeast to Dumalag and Cuartero, then traversing north through the municipalities of Dao and Panitan. In Panay the river splits, with the primary branch emptying into the Sibuyan Sea at Roxas City.

Tributaries 
The main tributaries of the river are the Tapaz River and Mambusao River on the left and the Badbaran River and Maayon River on the right.

Panay River list of tributaries by length:
Mambusao River (sub-basin area )
Badbaran River (sub-basin area )
Ma-ayon River (sub-basin area )
Tapaz River

References

Rivers of the Philippines
Landforms of Capiz